Mark Chung (born June 18, 1970) is an American former soccer midfielder who played ten seasons in Major League Soccer. He also earned twenty-four caps, scoring two goals, with the US national team.

Youth
Chung was born in Toronto to Hakka Chinese Jamaican parents.  His family moved from Toronto to Pembroke Pines, Florida, when Chung was twelve.  These moves created a choice for Chung when he received invitations to play from three national teams, the United States, Canada and Jamaica.  He ultimately elected to play for the US. After graduating from Cooper City High School, Chung attended the University of South Florida where he studied finance.  He also played on the men's soccer team from 1988 to 1992, finishing his collegiate soccer career with twenty-five assists. Chung is the cousin of the Jamaican international footballer Craig Ziadie.

Professional
In 1995, Chung played with the San Diego Sockers of the Continental Indoor Soccer League (CISL).  He scored twenty-nine goals en route to being named the league's Rookie of the Year.  Chung was drafted in the first round (sixth overall) by the Kansas City Wizards in the MLS Inaugural Draft, and finished 1996 with eight goals and nine assists.  Chung would be a mainstay at Kansas City for the next two years, was named to his first MLS Best XI in 1997, and would lead all of MLS in games played at the end of its first three seasons, with 97.  After 1998, Kansas City traded Chung to the MetroStars, with Mike Ammann in exchange for Tony Meola and Alexi Lalas.  He would play with the MetroStars for the next three seasons, but was greatly underused by Metro coach Octavio Zambrano. Chung called the role he played with the Metros an "idiot left wing". He was traded again before the 2002 season, this time to the Colorado Rapids in exchange for a draft pick.  Chung was very successful with the Rapids, making MLS Best XI's in both 2002 and 2003. However, with a coaching change to Fernando Clavijo in 2005, he became unhappy, and requested a trade. The wish was granted, as Chung was sent to San Jose for an allocation. In ten years of MLS league play, he scored 61 goals and added 76 assists.

Chung retired after the Quakes moved to Houston after the 2006 season. Upon his retirement, he had played in 278 league matches.  In 2008, he played one game with the Treasure Coast Galleons of the Florida Elite Soccer League.

National team
Despite a significant amount of success in MLS, Chung never had a significant role in the US national team.  Chung made his first appearance April 4, 1992 against his ancestral country, China, but in total made only 24 appearances, and scored only two goals.  He was the first of two Chinese-American players to play for the US, the second being Brian Ching.

References

External links
 
 MetroStars player profile

1970 births
Living people
American soccer players
Canadian emigrants to the United States
Jamaican people of Chinese descent
American people of Chinese descent
Hakka sportspeople
Canadian sportspeople of Jamaican descent
Colorado Rapids players
Continental Indoor Soccer League players
Florida Elite Soccer League players
Sporting Kansas City players
New York Red Bulls players
Soccer players from Toronto
San Diego Sockers (CISL) players
San Jose Earthquakes players
Soccer players from Florida
South Florida Bulls men's soccer players
Treasure Coast Galleons players
United States men's international soccer players
University of South Florida alumni
Major League Soccer All-Stars
Major League Soccer players
Canadian sportspeople of Chinese descent
Sportspeople from Pembroke Pines, Florida
1993 Copa América players
Association football midfielders